Salvia exserta is an annual herb that is native to the Rio Grande basin in Bolivia, and south into Argentina. It grows in stony ground in dry woodland at  elevation.

The corolla has an upper lip that is much longer than the lower.

Notes

exserta
Flora of Bolivia